This is a list of notable people from Rwanda.

Military
 Théoneste Bagosora (b. 1941), military officer convicted in 2008 of genocide
 Bernard Ntuyahaga
 Kayumba Nyamwasa, former army chief of staff and head of Intelligence
 James Kabarebe, current minister of defense
 Patrick Nyamvumba, current RDF chief of staff
 Augustin Bizimungu
 Innocent Sagahutu

Political figures 
 Agathe Uwilingiyimana former Prime Minister of Rwanda
 Jean-Paul Akayesu (b. 1953), politician convicted in 1998 of genocide
 Jean Bosco Barayagwiza
 Christophe Bazivamo, Minister of Land and Environment
 Augustin Bizimana (b. 1954), politician, fugitive of the International Criminal Tribunal for Rwanda
 Jean-Damascène Bizimana, former Rwandan ambassador to the UN
 Augustin Bizimungu (b. 1952), politician on trial for genocide
 Pasteur Bizimungu, former President of Rwanda
 Anastase Gasana, diplomat
 Juvénal Habyarimana, former President of Rwanda
 Jean Marie Higiro, former Director of the Rwandan Information Office
 Paul Kagame, President of Rwanda
 Jean Kambanda (b. 1955), former Prime Minister; pleaded guilty in 1998 to genocide
 Judith Kanakuze (1959–2010), politician and women's rights activist
 Janvier Kanyamashuli, ambassador to Burundi
 Grégoire Kayibanda, former President of Rwanda
 Kigeri V of Rwanda, former King
 Bernard Makuza, Prime Minister of Rwanda
 Dominique Mbonyumutwa, former provisional President of Rwanda
 Charles Munyaneza (b. 1958), genocide suspect
 Ignace Murwanashyaka (b. 1963), leader of the Democratic Forces for the Liberation of Rwanda
 Mutara II Rwogera, former King
 Mutara III of Rwanda, former King
 Lando Ndasingwa, former leader of Parti libéral du Rwanda
 André Ntagerura
 Jean de Dieu Ntiruhungwa, former Minister of the Interior
 Seth Sendashonga, former Minister of the Interior
 André Kagwa Rwisereka (1949–2010), opposition politician murdered during the 2010 election 
 Théodore Sindikubwabo, former President of the National Development Council
 Pascal Simbikangwa, former Chief of Intelligence, found guilty of complicity in genocide and complicity in crimes against humanity
 Faustin Twagiramungu, former Prime Minister of Rwanda
 Agathe Uwilingiyimana, former Prime Minister of Rwanda
 Yuhi III of Rwanda, former King of Rwanda
 Protais Zigiranyirazo
 Juvénal Uwilingiyimana

Religious figures
 Elizaphan Ntakirutimana (1924–2007), Seventh-day Adventist pastor
 Athanase Seromba (b. 1963), priest
 Laurien Ntezimana (b. 1955), theologian and peace activist
 Thomas Nahimana (b.1971), President of the Rwandan Government in Exile

Sports people
 Dieudonné Disi (b. 1980), long-distance and cross-country runner
 Adrien Niyonshuti (b. 1987), cyclist
 Mathias Ntawulikura (b. 1964), long-distance runner

Miscellaneous 
 Simon Bikindi (b. 1954), singer-songwriter convicted in 2008 of inciting violence during the 1994 genocide
 Agathe Habyarimana, widow of former President Juvénal Habyarimana
 Immaculée Ilibagiza, Rwandan-American author, Genocide survivor
 Charles Ingabire, journalist and government critic, murdered in 2011
 Félicien Kabuga (b. 1935), businessman
 Enos Kagaba, accused of genocide 
 Joseph Kavaruganda, former president of Rwanda's Constitutional Court
 Léon Mugesera, university lecturer accused of inciting genocide
 Ferdinand Nahimana, historian
 Samuel Ndashyikirwa, businessman
 Hassan Ngeze (b. 1962), journalist
 Étienne Nzabonimana (b. 1950), businessman
 Sonia Rolland, former Miss France
 Queen Rosalie Gicanda, wife of King Mutara III of Rwanda
 Jean-Léonard Rugambage, reporter and government critic, murdered in 2010
 Paul Rusesabagina (b. 1954), hotel manager known for saving refugees in the 1994 genocide
 Benjamin Sehene (b. 1959), author

References